Suntamon is a village in Suntamon district, Yahukimo Regency in Highland Papua province, Indonesia. Its population is 292.

Climate
Suntamon has a cold subtropical highland climate (Cfb) with very heavy rainfall year-round.

References

Villages in Highland Papua